Guestroom is the fourth studio album by the band Ivy. It was released on September 10, 2002 by Minty Fresh and Unfiltered Records. Unlike the group's previous albums, the album consisted entirely of cover songs, without any new material. Some of the songs featured on the album were previously released as B-sides to the band's singles.

Two singles were released from Guestroom. Lead single, "Digging Your Scene" was previously recorded for Ivy's previous studio release, Long Distance (2001), but an updated version appeared on this album for the single release. "Let's Go to Bed" was released as the final single for the album in late 2002. Another song, "I Guess I'm Just a Little Too Sensitive", was also previously recorded on their debut extended play, Lately.

Upon release, Guestroom featured mostly positive reviews from music critics, who praised the covers included on the album. Dominique Durand's vocals were also praised for being "wispy" and "warm".

The Japanese edition of Guestroom was reissued on April 18, 2015, in the United States by Minty Fresh.

Critical reception

Guestroom received generally positive reviews from critics. MacKenzie Wilson of AllMusic praised Ivy for the "divine picks, particularly "I Don't Know Why I Love You", further adding that "Guestroom is an added bonus for new and old fans alike". In a divided review, Noel Dix of Exclaim! stated that "sadly, this is not the follow-up to stunning Long Distance", but later added that "the real treat of Guestroom is the stunning manipulation of "Be My Baby".

Track listing
All tracks produced by Andy Chase and Adam Schlesinger, except "Be My Baby", which is also produced by Gary Maurer.

Personnel 
Credits and personnel adapted from Guestroom liner notes and Andy Chase's discography.
Marty Beller – drums
Andy Chase – producer, mixer, engineer
Ruddy Cullers – engineer
Dominique Durand – lead and backing vocals
Gary Maurer – mandolin
Mark Plati – mixer
Pedro Resende – co-producer
Geoff Sanoff – engineer
Adam Schlesinger – producer

Release history

References

2002 albums
Ivy (band) albums
Minty Fresh Records albums
Albums produced by Adam Schlesinger